David Scott FitzGerald is a sociologist and professor at UCSD and the Theodore E. Gildred Chair in U.S.-Mexican Relations.

Works

References

Living people
University of California, San Diego faculty
International relations scholars
Migration studies scholars
Year of birth missing (living people)